Tiffany is the debut studio album by American singer Tiffany, released on September 15, 1987, by MCA Records. Prior to signing a recording contract with MCA Records in 1987, Tiffany had begun working with manager and record producer George Tobin several years earlier, possibly with some of the tracks recorded as early as when she was 12 years old. Initially, "Danny" was her first single released from her self-titled studio album; however the single failed to chart. To support the album and create a buzz for herself, Tiffany embarked on a shopping mall tour entitled "The Beautiful You: Celebrating the Good Life Shopping Mall Tour '87". The tour included Tiffany performing in shopping malls across the United States; at first to small audiences but by the end to much larger crowds as her popularity grew.

As her popularity grew during her tour, radio stations began to play Tiffany's cover version of Tommy James & the Shondells' song "I Think We're Alone Now". The song was quickly released as the album's second single; Tiffany's cover of "I Think We're Alone Now" became the singer's first No. 1 single both in the United States and United Kingdom. The album's follow-up single "Could've Been" became the singer's second No. 1 single on the Billboard Hot 100 chart and her first on the Adult Contemporary chart. With the help of those two singles, the album peaked at No. 1 on Billboards Top Pop Albums chart, staying for two weeks; replacing George Michael's Faith. At the age of 16 years, Tiffany became the youngest female artist to achieve a No. 1 album, the first female solo and third artist to chart on the Billboard 200 under the age of 18, and the youngest to have two consecutive No. 1 singles. Tiffany's rendition of the Beatles' "I Saw Her Standing There" retitled "I Saw Him Standing There" provided a final success from the album. The album was certified quadruple platinum by the Recording Industry Association of America (RIAA) on April 5, 1988.

The album's final single, "Feelings of Forever" failed to reprise the success of Tiffany's three previous singles.

Critical reception 

Upon its initial release, Tiffany received mixed-to-positive reviews from critics. Anthony Decurtis of Rolling Stone gave the album an unfavorable review, describing the album as an "artificial construction that Tiffany occupies with neither authority nor uniqueness." The reviewer criticized the production, songwriting, and management for "letting Tiff down" and described her cover of "I Think We're Alone Now" as "sterile" compared to the original and "I Saw Her Standing There" as a "conceptual disaster". Chris Tworney of Record Mirror was a bit more positive, reviewing the singer, at the time, as the "latest in seemingly inexhaustible supply of virgin prunes to dominate [the] charts." In a retrospective review, Bryan Buss of AllMusic described the material as "enjoyable without being schlocky", and reviewed tracks "Kid on a Corner," "Should've Been Me," "Johnny's Got the Inside Moves," and "Danny" as "all inoffensive, mid-tempo tunes that are more than just filler." Concluding the review, he states that even though this is a "fair debut for a young singer with a voice she'd grow into," her follow-up, Hold an Old Friend's Hand, is "more consistently realized."

Music critic Robert Christgau gave the album a "B", describing it as "a fantasy album about the growing pains of a wholesome California teen, flexing her sexuality slightly as she moons over that soulful Mexican boy, with two schlock classics of its own."

Track listing

B-sides 
"No Rules" (Paul Mark, John Edward Duarte) - 4:05
"The Heart of Love" (Paul Mark, John Edward Duarte) - 3:58
"Mr. Mambo" (Paul Mark, John Edward Duarte) - 5:48
"Gotta Be Love" (Paul Mark, John Edward Duarte) - 4:18
"Out of My Heart" (Paul Mark, John Edward Duarte) - 3:48
"Heart Don't Break Tonight" (Steven McClintock, Timothy James Auringer) - 4:19
"Can't Stop a Heartbeat" (Paul Mark, John Edward Duarte) (Non-U.S. B-side) - 4:46 / long version - 4:52

Personnel 
 Tiffany – lead and backing vocals
 John Duarte – arrangements, synthesizers (1-6, 8, 9), drum programming (1-9), keyboards (7), synth bass (7), additional synthesizers (10)
 Ned McElroy – keyboards (7)
 Steve Rucker – acoustic piano (10), synthesizers (10)
 Dann Huff – guitars (1, 3, 4, 5, 10)
 Chuck Yamek – guitars (1, 6, 9)
 Carl Verheyen – guitars (2)
 Craig T. Cooper – guitars (7)
 Willie Ornelas – drums (10)
 Richard Elliot – saxophone (1, 7)

Production
 George Tobin – producer, remixing, management
 Bill Smith – engineer and remixing (1-5, 7, 9, 10)
 John Kerns – engineer and remixing (6, 8), additional recording 
 Steve Holroyd – second engineer 
 John Kliner – second engineer 
 David Means – second engineer 
 Bryan Rutter – second engineer 
 Steve Hall – mastering at Future Disc (Hollywood, California)
 Brenda Farrell – production coordination
 Valerie Trotter – production coordination
 Larry Solters – "stunt" coordinator 
 Irving Azoff – "miracles"
 Randee St. Nicholas – photography 
 Brad Schmidt – management

Charts

Weekly charts

Year-end charts

Certifications and sales

References

1987 debut albums
MCA Records albums
Tiffany Darwish albums